Startling Odyssey is a series of Japan-exclusive RPG games developed by Ray Force originally for the PC Engine CD-Rom which later received remakes for the PlayStation.

PC Engine Super CD-Rom
The original games were Startling Odyssey and Startling Odyssey II.  Contrary to their number associations, the series progressed backwards; hence, the supposed Startling Odyssey III: Miriam no Seisen, would've been the first chronologically, followed by Startling Odyssey II: Maryu Sensou, and then Startling Odyssey I: Blue Evolution.

Startling Odyssey II

Main characters

Robin Solford
The 20-year-old knight captain of the Hyneld kingdom.  He has a very stalwart sense of duty and his reputation greatly precedes him.  He's known by many as the ”青い死神” or "Blue Death God".  He is the strongest of the knights of the Hyneld kingdom and his skill with a sword is legendary.  Unfortunately, he is extremely thick in the head when it comes to relationships and women in general, making this a main source of comedy in the game.

Julia Melrose
An 18-year-old highly accomplished magician with few peers and an extremely talented doctor.  She nurses Robin back to health after he falls from a bridge on the summit of a mountain pass.  She eventually travels with Robin and falls deeply in love with him.  She is extremely conscious about the enormous size of her breasts and this is also a major source of comedy in the game.

Vivian Caram
A 17-year-old tough tomboyish nun who is highly gifted in the art of kenpō.  She single-handedly clobbers a large group of bandits out of a wrongful accusation and is well known for her signature move "Vivian Bomber" which she uses repeatedly (and to comedic effect) throughout the game.  A comic relief in the game, Vivian tends to say some caustic things and has a predilection towards ingenuous suggestions and fulminations towards several NPCs in the game.

Galious Ruding
A 27-year-old bandit leader and ex-special agent, Galious was hand-picked and trained as a ninja alongside his best friend and superior, Bullet Thunder.  Fast, powerful, and dangerous, Galious is capable of easily fending off multiple attacks from Vivian single-handedly.  A scandalous pervert and womanizer, Galious's tendencies as a peeping tom (and his contingent tendency to force Robin to join him) are a source of high level adult-humor in the game.  Despite his perverted shortcomings, he has an extremely strong sense of loyalty and would risk his life to save his friends.

Plot
The events of Startling Odyssey II begin with the mad scientist Dr. Killbait attempting to resurrect one of the 8 "Demon Dragons" in an underground laboratory in the Hyneld Continent.  Dr. Killbait ultimately succeeds; however, the dragon escapes, destroying the laboratory in the process as well as destroying half of a town.  Elsewhere, the protagonist of the game, Knight Captain Robin Solford, and his two cohorts, Balmor Roatlette, and Harold Norman, are patrolling the Feidan Forest as a result of the recent reports of a chimera threatening the area.  Robin quickly senses the presence of the chimera and the three are subsequently attacked by the enormous beast.  Balmor and Harold draw their blades and attack it, but only to be thwarted by the chimera's massive natural armor, their swords shattering into pieces in the process.  As Balmor comments how it's invulnerable to their weapons, Robin proceeds to attack the chimera and fells it in one swing, slicing the great beast in two, much to the chagrin of Balmor and Harold.  Returning to Hyneld Castle, Robin meets with King Hyneld and is informed of the strange happenings in the neighboring town south of the Hyneld Kingdom (which so happens to be the same town from which the dragon escaped).  Robin then sees his adoptive sister, Patricia Hyneld, who professes her concern over his journeys.  Promptly he reassures her he will be alright and quickly leaves with Balmor and Harold.  As Robin and his friends investigate the underground laboratory they find an odd magical amulet which Harold attempts to read, but can't since the characters are too difficult. Presently, Hyneld Castle is attacked by the same dragon that had escaped.  Having never anticipated the attack of a dragon, the castle's guards are no match for the terrific onslaught and many are slain.  In an effort to avoid capture, several guards escape with Princess Patricia Hyneld via an underground passage.  As Robin, Balmor, and Harold continue to follow, the same dragon that attacked the castle appears and threatens to kill them.  Just as the dragon is about to attack, Balmor shoves Robin out of the room and collapses the entrance with a bomb he took prior to leaving the castle.  Estranged from his friends, Robin carries on, regretfully leaving Balmor and Harold to their inevitable fates.  Continuing on his new odyssey, Robin gets wind of the Princess being spotted in the Canary Continent.  As he heads there through a mountain pass, he encounters an old man who cautions him of the dangers of the area.  Without heeding his warning, Robin attempts to cross a bridge and subsequently an earthquake starts, collapsing the bridge and causing Robin to fall from the summit.

Robin awakens in a room and is greeted by Dr. Julia Melrose, who promptly treated his injuries.  Julia expresses her surprise at how quickly Robin healed, commenting that for most people, it would've taken months to heal.  Their conversation is cut short as a townsperson quickly enters to warn Julia of monsters that have managed to enter the town.  Julia quickly leaves Robin to rest and is met by 3 powerful monsters that have managed to seriously wound a large number of the townsfolk.  Demonstrating her prowess in magic, Julia easily dispatches 2 of the monsters; however, the last one left is much stronger and managed to erect a high level magic shield, making her attack powerless.  Just as the demon is about to kill Julia, Robin quickly intervenes, stopping the full speed attack of the monster with only his sword.  Completely baffled and taken aback at seeing such a strong human, the monster attempts to press his attack further, but is pushed back by Robin.  Shattering his magic shield with a single stroke of his sword, Robin mounts a terrific attack against the monster, cutting him in half lengthwise in a spectacular display.  Julia, in disbelief at how quickly he was able to heal and fight given his injuries, promptly runs up to him just as he collapses from fatigue.  After Robin fully recovers, he assists Julia in procuring a magical feather to help cure a sick child and then quickly continues on his journey.  Just as he enters an ice cavern connecting the continent, he is attacked and frozen solid into a magical ice prison set to thaw out within the next thousand years.  Julia, feeling something is wrong, wishes to go with him yet at the same time expresses her doubts given her elderly grandmother's condition.  Her grandmother, hearing her self-doubts, presses her on to go and follow Robin, knowing well that Julia has already fallen in love with him.  Julia thanks her grandmother and with her magic frees Robin and joins him.  They eventually find a fairy forest, where Robin begins to learn about his family's roots from the fairy.  Robin and Julia eventually meet with a tomboyish fighting monk named Vivian who leaves her convent in an attempt to find their own town's amulet which was reportedly stolen.  Robin and Julia eventually chase Vivian to a bandit hideout where they witness her fighting with the bandit leader, Galious Ruding.  As the four begin to learn about the powers of the amulet and the amulet found at the destroyed laboratory in the Hyneld Continent, they begin to understand their link towards the reawakening of the 8 Demon Dragons, their need to stop Killbait, and their desire to help Robin find Patricia Hyneld.

As the game progresses, Robin begins to slowly subconsciously unlock his own hidden powers as one of the Solfords.  The party learns of the lineage of the Solford family and their terrifying powers and their struggle against the Dark Ones.  When they finally find Patricia, to Robin's horror, her mind and body are corrupted and twisted into evil by Dr. Killbait who encased her in a suit of high technology powered armor.  As Robin attacks Killbait out of rage, Patricia intervenes and easily fends off Robin with a forceful blast of energy.  Robin and Patricia duel each other in a terrific magic battle with Robin being able to easily shield his friends from her attacks using his powers.  In the midst of the attack Patricia comes to her senses and stops her attack at the extreme protest of Killbait.  Unable to detach herself from the armor as it is directly connected to her body, she begs Robin to stop Killbait and to erase the darkness from the world as she slowly ascends and sacrifices herself by causing her armor to self-destruct.  Upon seeing the death of his adoptive sister and closest friend, Robin loses control of himself and is about to charge and attack Killbait when he is stopped at the pleading of Julia.  Robin then swears an oath of vengeance against Killbait just as he is making his escape.

Near the end of the game, Robin manages to procure the legendary Helios Sword, the sword of the Solford family; and, recreates the Soul Armor, one of the last pieces of advanced technology armor rendering all weapons and attacks powerless against him.  Using their power, Robin manages to fulfill his oath of vengeance on Dr. Killbait and exterminate the rest of the Demon Dragons.  As the last of the demon dragons, Babylon, is defeated, the group disbands happily, believing that peace is restored.  Robin, choosing to live quietly rather than continue his work as a knight, is joined by Julia and eventually the two are married and have a son, Leon Solford, the main protagonist in Startling Odyssey I: Blue Evolution. 2 years after the defeat of Babylon however, a machine/program left behind from an advanced technological age of humanity recreates one of the Demon Dragons, Sodom, making him more powerful than even Babylon.  Taking control of the Big Eye defense satellite, Sodom proceeds to rain down flaming asteroids onto the planet, destroying a large chunk of the Hyneld Continent and several other towns.  Having understood what needs to be done, Robin, now in full control of his powers, teleports to see the great wiseman Rossberg and the great dragon and king of the demon world, Galadan.  He leaves both the Helios Sword and the Soul Armor in their custody and teleports himself to the Tower of Stars where he is sent via a teleport pad directly to the Big Eye; Robin destroying the Tower's teleport pad as a safeguard.  With no way to return home, Robin confronts Sodom and the two engage in a quick, but extremely fierce battle.  Sodom, many times stronger than he was 2 years ago, impales Robin through his armor with his claw.  Using his powers however, Robin absorbs Sodom's own power and, channeling all of his own life into one final attack, Robin releases his full power and disintegrates and vaporizes Sodom with a flash of light.  Having used all his life energy and after taking a severe mortal blow from Sodom, Robin dies a noble death with his final words, "Julia, I leave the future in your hands."  Robin dies, just as the satellite self-destructs; its explosion visible to everyone on the planet.  As the light of the explosion sparkles, Julia (now Julia Solford) watches tearfully and smiles as she thanks Robin for the gift of his child.

PlayStation
Startling Odyssey I: Blue Evolution was the only PlayStation remake to actually see release. Two planned sequels, Startling Odyssey II: Maryu Sensou and Startling Odyssey III: Miriam no Seisen, were both canceled.

References

External links
 

Fantasy video games
Japan-exclusive video games
PlayStation (console) games
Role-playing video games
TurboGrafx-CD games
Video games developed in Japan
Video game franchises